Eunike (minor planet designation: 185 Eunike) is a dark and very large main-belt asteroid, with an approximate diameter of 157 kilometres. It has a primitive carbonaceous composition.

It was discovered by C. H. F. Peters on March 1, 1878, in Clinton, New York and named after Eunike, a Nereid in Greek mythology whose name means 'happy victory'. The name was chosen to celebrate the Treaty of San Stefano (1878).

Based upon photometric observations made between 2010 and 2014, this asteroid has a rotation period of 21.812 ± 0.001 hours and a brightness
variation of 0.08 ± 0.01 in magnitude. At opposition, the absolute magnitude was measured at 7.45 ± 0.01. It displays a hemispheric albedo dichotomy similar to that on 4 Vesta.

As of 17 September 2020, there have been thirteen observed occultations of stars by Eunike.

References

External links 
 
 

Background asteroids
Eunike
Eunike
Objects observed by stellar occultation
C-type asteroids (Tholen)
C-type asteroids (SMASS)
18780301